Golden Door may refer to:

America's Golden Door, a nickname for Jersey City
Ellis Island, the "golden door" through which many immigrants to the USA have passed
Golden Door Film Festival
The New Colossus, a poem which ends with the phrase
Nuovomondo, a 2006 film known in English as "Golden Door"
The Golden Door, the first book in The Three Doors book series